Martin Pfaff (born 31 March 1939) is a German economist and politician of the Social Democratic Party of Germany (SPD) who was a member of the Bundestag from 1990 to 2002.

Early life and education 
Pfaff was born in Tevel (now in Tolna County, Hungary) on 31 March 1939. After completing high school, he studied in India, graduating with a Bachelor of Commerce degree in 1961. He then studied at the University of Pennsylvania in the United States, earning an MBA in 1963 and PhD in economics. During his student years he was a staff member and honorary treasurer of two schools for the blind in India, from 1958 to 1962.

Academic career 
From 1965 to 1974, Pfaff worked as a university lecturer and professor at various universities in the United States. Since 1971 he has also held an economics chair at the University of Augsburg. He was founder and scientific director of the International Institute for Empirical Social Economics (INIFES), a socioeconomic research center based in Stadtbergen, near Augsburg. He has authored and edited several books and monograph and numerous articles on economic and social policy.

Political career 
In 1976 Pfaff became a member of the local branch of the SPD in Hochfeld, and he soon became a local party leader for Swabia. He became a member of the Association of the Social Democrats for Health Care (ASG) and in 1994, National Chairman of the ASG. In 1990, Pfaff was elected to the Bundestag, where he served three terms of office, until 2002.

Personal life 
He is married to Anita Bose Pfaff (born 1942), also an economics professor, and the daughter of Indian nationalist Subhas Chandra Bose. They have three children: Peter Arun, Thomas Krishna, and Maya Carina.

References

External links 
 
 Official biography on the Bundestag website

1939 births
Living people
People from Tolna County
Members of the Bundestag for Bavaria
Members of the Bundestag 1998–2002
Members of the Bundestag 1994–1998
Wharton School of the University of Pennsylvania alumni
German economists
Subhas Chandra Bose
Members of the Bundestag for the Social Democratic Party of Germany